New York's 32nd State Senate district is one of 63 districts in the New York State Senate. It has been represented by Democrat Luis R. Sepúlveda since his victory in a 2018 special election to replace fellow Democrat Rubén Díaz Sr.

Geography
District 32 is located in the south and central Bronx, including some or all of the neighborhoods of Parkchester, Soundview, West Farms, Hunts Point, Longwood, Concourse, Melrose, Morrisania, Mott Haven, East Tremont, and Westchester Square.

The district overlaps with New York's 14th and 15th congressional districts, and with the 77th, 79th, 82nd, 84th, 85th, and 87th districts of the New York State Assembly.

Recent election results

2020

2018

2018 special

2016

2014

In 2014, Díaz Sr. also ran on the Republican party line.

2012

Federal results in District 32

References

32